"You Wreck Me" is a song by Tom Petty, the fourth track on his album Wildflowers. The song was released as the second single from the album, and became a concert staple. While the song did not chart on the Billboard Hot 100, it peaked at #2 on the Mainstream Rock chart.

History
The music for this song was written by Petty's longtime partner and guitarist Mike Campbell. Petty originally wrote some words to the song and called it "You Rock Me". Campbell thought the title was a little ordinary and very cliché, but the song sounded fine and they recorded it. Eventually, Petty came back and decided to change the title to "You Wreck Me", and the new title changed the whole meaning of the song.

Live performances
Tom Petty and the Heartbreakers performed the song on 494 different occasions, including their last show at the Hollywood Bowl in Los Angeles in 2017. It was a regular song during every tour after 1995, as well as at the Fillmore residencies in 1997 and 1999. The song was first performed in concert in 1995 at the Louisville Gardens in Kentucky. It was commonly played as an encore.

Track listing
The song was released on a maxi CD single, a cassette single, and a promo CD single. The cassette and CD versions both featured alternate versions of two other tracks from Wildflowers: "Only a Broken Heart" and "Cabin Down Below".

"You Wreck Me" – 3:22
"Cabin Down Below" – 2:45
"Only a Broken Heart" – 4:41

Personnel
 Tom Petty – vocals, electric guitar
 Mike Campbell – electric guitar
 Benmont Tench – piano, Hammond organ
 Howie Epstein – bass guitar, harmony vocals
 Steve Ferrone – drums

Charts

References

Tom Petty songs
1994 singles
Songs written by Tom Petty
Song recordings produced by Rick Rubin
1994 songs
Songs written by Mike Campbell (musician)